A list of films produced in Egypt in 1976. For an A-Z list of films currently on Wikipedia, see :Category:Egyptian films.

External links
 Egyptian films of 1976 at the Internet Movie Database
 Egyptian films of 1976 elCinema.com

Lists of Egyptian films by year
1976 in Egypt
Lists of 1976 films by country or language